The South Sudan National Olympic Committee is the National Olympic Committee representing South Sudan. It was founded in Juba on 8 June 2015, and became a full member of the International Olympic Committee and the Olympic Movement on 2 August 2015.  The theme of the June meeting was "Let's build peace and unity through sport", reflecting the ongoing South Sudanese Civil War. The founding president is Lt-Gen. Wilson Deng Kuoirot.

Affiliated sports

See also
 South Sudan at the Olympics

References

External links
South Sudan International Olympic Committee website

South Sudan
Sports organizations established in 2015
South Sudan at the Olympics
Oly
2015 establishments in South Sudan